Phragmocarpidium is a genus of flowering plants belonging to the family Malvaceae.

Its native range is Brazil.

Species
Species:
 Phragmocarpidium heringeri Krapov.

References

Hibisceae
Malvaceae genera